Olivier Hussenot (10 September 1913 – 25 August 1978) was a French theatre and film actor.

Career
The actor appeared in French, Italian and American films.

Selected filmography

References

External links 
 

1913 births
1978 deaths
French male film actors
French male stage actors
Male actors from Paris
20th-century French male actors